Jean Kellens (born 26 January 1944 in Seraing, Belgium) is a Belgian Iranologist who is skilled in Avestan studies. From 1974 to 1980 he was the assistant of the German Professor, Helmut Humbach at Johannes Gutenberg University of Mainz.  He also taught at the University of Liège until 1993 and then became a member of the Science Committee at the Collège de France.

Works
 Les noms-racines de l'Avesta, Dr. Ludwig Reichert Verlag, Wiesbaden, 1974.
 Le verbe avestique, Dr. Ludwig Reichert Verlag, Wiesbaden, 1984
 Avec Éric Pirart: Les textes vieil-avestiques, 3 volumes, Dr. Ludwig Reichert Verlag, Wiesbaden, 1988, 1990, 1991.

 Le panthéon de l'Avesta ancien, Dr ; Ludwig Reichert Verlag, Wiesbaden, 1994.

 Liste du verbe avestique, Wiesbaden, Dr. Ludwig Reichert Verlag, 1995.
 Essays on Zarathustra and Zoroastrianism, Mazda Publishers, Costa Mesa, 2000.
 La quatrième naissance de Zarathushtra, Paris, Seuil, 2006.
 Études avestiques et mazdéennes, vol. I: Le Ratauuō vīspe mazišta, Paris, 2006.
 Études avestiques et mazdéennes, vol. II: Le Hōm Stōm et la zone des déclarations, Paris, 2007.
 Études avestiques et mazdéennes, vol. III: Le long préambule du sacrifice (Yasna 16 à 27.12, avec les intercalations de Visprad 7 à 12), Paris, 2010

References 

Living people
1944 births
Iranologists
Academic staff of the University of Liège